In quantum physics, a quantum state is a mathematical entity that provides a probability distribution for the outcomes of each possible measurement on a system. Knowledge of the quantum state together with the rules for the system's evolution in time exhausts all that can be predicted about the system's behavior. A mixture of quantum states is again a quantum state. Quantum states that cannot be written as a mixture of other states are called pure quantum states, while all other states are called mixed quantum states. A pure quantum state can be represented by a ray in a Hilbert space over the complex numbers, while mixed states are represented by density matrices, which are positive semidefinite operators that act on Hilbert spaces.

Pure states are also known as state vectors or wave functions, the latter term applying particularly when they are represented as functions of position or momentum. For example, when dealing with the energy spectrum of the electron in a hydrogen atom, the relevant state vectors are identified by the principal quantum number , the angular momentum quantum number , the magnetic quantum number , and the spin z-component . For another example, if the spin of an electron is measured in any direction, e.g. with a Stern–Gerlach experiment, there are two possible results: up or down. The Hilbert space for the electron's spin is therefore two-dimensional, constituting a qubit. A pure state here is represented by a two-dimensional complex vector , with a length of one; that is, with

A mixed state, in this case, has the structure of a  matrix that is Hermitian and positive semi-definite, and has trace 1. A more complicated case is given (in bra–ket notation) by the singlet state, which exemplifies quantum entanglement:

which involves superposition of joint spin states for two particles with spin . The singlet state satisfies the property that if the particles' spins are measured along the same direction then either the spin of the first particle is observed up and the spin of the second particle is observed down, or the first one is observed down and the second one is observed up, both possibilities occurring with equal probability.

A mixed quantum state corresponds to a probabilistic mixture of pure states; however, different distributions of pure states can generate equivalent (i.e., physically indistinguishable) mixed states. The Schrödinger–HJW theorem classifies the multitude of ways to write a given mixed state as a convex combination of pure states. Before a particular measurement is performed on a quantum system, the theory gives only a probability distribution for the outcome, and the form that this distribution takes is completely determined by the quantum state and the linear operators describing the measurement. Probability distributions for different measurements exhibit tradeoffs exemplified by the uncertainty principle: a state that implies a narrow spread of possible outcomes for one experiment necessarily implies a wide spread of possible outcomes for another.

Conceptual description

Pure states

In the mathematical formulation of quantum mechanics, pure quantum states correspond to vectors in a Hilbert space, while each observable quantity (such as the energy or momentum of a particle) is associated with a mathematical operator. The operator serves as a linear function which acts on the states of the system. The eigenvalues of the operator correspond to the possible values of the observable. For example, it is possible to observe a particle with a momentum of 1 kg⋅m/s if and only if one of the eigenvalues of the momentum operator is 1 kg⋅m/s. The corresponding eigenvector (which physicists call an eigenstate) with eigenvalue 1 kg⋅m/s would be a quantum state with a definite, well-defined value of momentum of 1 kg⋅m/s, with no quantum uncertainty. If its momentum were measured, the result is guaranteed to be 1 kg⋅m/s.

On the other hand, a system in a superposition of multiple different eigenstates does in general have quantum uncertainty for the given observable. We can represent this linear combination of eigenstates as:

The coefficient which corresponds to a particular state in the linear combination is a complex number, thus allowing interference effects between states. The coefficients are time dependent. How a quantum state changes in time is governed by the time evolution operator.

Statistical mixtures of states are a different type of linear combination. A statistical mixture of states is a statistical ensemble of independent systems. Statistical mixtures represent the degree of knowledge whilst the uncertainty within quantum mechanics is fundamental. Mathematically, a statistical mixture is not a combination using complex coefficients, but rather a combination using real-valued, positive probabilities of different states . A number  represents the probability of a randomly selected system being in the state . Unlike the linear combination case each system is in a definite eigenstate.

The expectation value  of an observable  is a statistical mean of measured values of the observable. It is this mean, and the distribution of probabilities, that is predicted by physical theories.

There is no state which is simultaneously an eigenstate for all observables. For example, we cannot prepare a state such that both the position measurement  and the momentum measurement  (at the same time ) are known exactly; at least one of them will have a range of possible values. This is the content of the Heisenberg uncertainty relation.

Moreover, in contrast to classical mechanics, it is unavoidable that performing a measurement on the system generally changes its state. More precisely: After measuring an observable A, the system will be in an eigenstate of A; thus the state has changed, unless the system was already in that eigenstate. This expresses a kind of logical consistency: If we measure A twice in the same run of the experiment, the measurements being directly consecutive in time, then they will produce the same results. This has some strange consequences, however, as follows.

If we measure only , all runs of the experiment will yield the same result.
Thus: Quantum mechanical measurements influence one another, and the order in which they are performed is important.

Another feature of quantum states becomes relevant if we consider a physical system that consists of multiple subsystems; for example, an experiment with two particles rather than one. Quantum physics allows for certain states, called entangled states, that show certain statistical correlations between measurements on the two particles which cannot be explained by classical theory. For details, see entanglement. These entangled states lead to experimentally testable properties (Bell's theorem)
that allow us to distinguish between quantum theory and alternative classical (non-quantum) models.

Schrödinger picture vs. Heisenberg picture

One can take the observables to be dependent on time, while the state σ was fixed once at the beginning of the experiment. This approach is called the Heisenberg picture. (This approach was taken in the later part of the discussion above, with time-varying observables , .) One can, equivalently, treat the observables as fixed, while the state of the system depends on time; that is known as the Schrödinger picture. (This approach was taken in the earlier part of the discussion above, with a time-varying state .) Conceptually (and mathematically), the two approaches are equivalent; choosing one of them is a matter of convention.

Both viewpoints are used in quantum theory. While non-relativistic quantum mechanics is usually formulated in terms of the Schrödinger picture, the Heisenberg picture is often preferred in a relativistic context, that is, for quantum field theory. Compare with Dirac picture.

Formalism in quantum physics

Pure states as rays in a complex Hilbert space

Quantum physics is most commonly formulated in terms of linear algebra, as follows. Any given system is identified with some finite- or infinite-dimensional Hilbert space. The pure states correspond to vectors of norm 1. Thus the set of all pure states corresponds to the unit sphere in the Hilbert space, because the unit sphere is defined as the set of all vectors with norm 1.

Multiplying a pure state by a scalar is physically inconsequential (as long as the state is considered by itself).

Bra–ket notation

Calculations in quantum mechanics make frequent use of linear operators, scalar products, dual spaces and Hermitian conjugation. In order to make such calculations flow smoothly, and to make it unnecessary (in some contexts) to fully understand the underlying linear algebra, Paul Dirac invented a notation to describe quantum states, known as bra–ket notation. Although the details of this are beyond the scope of this article, some consequences of this are:
The expression used to denote a state vector (which corresponds to a pure quantum state) takes the form  (where the "" can be replaced by any other symbols, letters, numbers, or even words). This can be contrasted with the usual mathematical notation, where vectors are usually lower-case Latin letters, and it is clear from the context that they are indeed vectors.
Dirac defined two kinds of vector, bra and ket, dual to each other.
Each ket  is uniquely associated with a so-called bra, denoted , which corresponds to the same physical quantum state. Technically, the bra is the adjoint of the ket. It is an element of the dual space, and related to the ket by the Riesz representation theorem.
Scalar products (also called brackets) are written so as to look like a bra and ket next to each other:  (The phrase "bra-ket" is supposed to resemble "bracket".)

Spin

The angular momentum has the same dimension (M·L·T) as the Planck constant and, at quantum scale, behaves as a discrete degree of freedom of a quantum system. Most particles possess a kind of intrinsic angular momentum that does not appear at all in classical mechanics and arises from Dirac's relativistic generalization of the theory. Mathematically it is described with spinors. In non-relativistic quantum mechanics the group representations of the Lie group SU(2) are used to describe this additional freedom. For a given particle, the choice of representation (and hence the range of possible values of the spin observable) is specified by a non-negative number  that, in units of Planck's reduced constant , is either an integer (0, 1, 2 ...) or a half-integer (1/2, 3/2, 5/2 ...). For a massive particle with spin , its spin quantum number  always assumes one of the 2S + 1 possible values in the set 

As a consequence, the quantum state of a particle with spin is described by a vector-valued wave function with values in C2S+1. Equivalently, it is represented by a complex-valued function of four variables: one discrete quantum number variable (for the spin) is added to the usual three continuous variables (for the position in space).

Many-body states and particle statistics

The quantum state of a system of N particles, each potentially with spin, is described by a complex-valued function with four variables per particle, corresponding to 3 spatial coordinates and spin, e.g.

Here, the spin variables mν assume values from the set 

where  is the spin of ν-th particle.  for a particle that does not exhibit spin.

The treatment of identical particles is very different for bosons (particles with integer spin) versus fermions (particles with half-integer spin). The above N-particle function must either be symmetrized (in the bosonic case) or anti-symmetrized (in the fermionic case) with respect to the particle numbers. If not all N particles are identical, but some of them are, then the function must be (anti)symmetrized separately over the variables corresponding to each group of identical variables, according to its statistics (bosonic or fermionic).

When symmetrization or anti-symmetrization is unnecessary, N-particle spaces of states can be obtained simply by tensor products of one-particle spaces, to which we will return later.

Basis states of one-particle systems
As with any Hilbert space, if a basis is chosen for the Hilbert space of a system, then any ket can be expanded as a linear combination of those basis elements. Symbolically, given basis kets , any ket  can be written

where  are complex numbers. In physical terms, this is described by saying that  has been expressed as a quantum superposition of the states . If the basis kets are chosen to be orthonormal (as is often the case), then .

One property worth noting is that the normalized states  are characterized by

and for orthonormal basis this translates to

Expansions of this sort play an important role in measurement in quantum mechanics. (The normalization condition above mandates that the total sum of probabilities is equal to one.)

A particularly important example is the position basis, which is the basis consisting of eigenstates  with eigenvalues  of the observable which corresponds to measuring position. If these eigenstates are nondegenerate (for example, if the system is a single, spinless particle), then any ket  is associated with a complex-valued function of three-dimensional space

In terms of the continuous set of position basis , the state  is:

Superposition of pure states

As mentioned above, quantum states may be superposed.

is a different quantum state (possibly not normalized). However,  and  will correspond to the same physical state. This is sometimes described by saying that "global" phase factors are unphysical, but "relative" phase factors are physical and important.

One practical example of superposition is the double-slit experiment, in which superposition leads to quantum interference. The photon state is a superposition of two different states, one corresponding to the photon travel through the left slit, and the other corresponding to travel through the right slit. The relative phase of those two states depends on the difference of the distances from the two slits. Depending on that phase, the interference is constructive at some locations and destructive in others, creating the interference pattern. We may say that superposed states are in coherent superposition, by analogy with coherence in other wave phenomena.

Another example of the importance of relative phase in quantum superposition is Rabi oscillations, where the relative phase of two states varies in time due to the Schrödinger equation. The resulting superposition ends up oscillating back and forth between two different states.

Mixed states

A pure quantum state is a state which can be described by a single ket vector, as described above. A mixed quantum state is a statistical ensemble of pure states (see quantum statistical mechanics).

Mixed states arise in quantum mechanics in two different situations: first, when the preparation of the system is not fully known, and thus one must deal with a statistical ensemble of possible preparations; and second, when one wants to describe a physical system which is entangled with another, as its state cannot be described by a pure state. In the first case, there could theoretically be another person who knows the full history of the system, and therefore describe the same system as a pure state; in this case, the density matrix is simply used to represent the limited knowledge of a quantum state. In the second case, however, the existence of quantum entanglement theoretically prevents the existence of complete knowledge about the subsystem, and it's impossible for any person to describe the subsystem of an entangled pair as a pure state.

Mixed states inevitably arise from pure states when, for a composite quantum system  with an entangled state on it, the part  is inaccessible to the observer.

A mixed state cannot be described with a single ket vector. Instead, it is described by its associated density matrix (or density operator), usually denoted ρ. Note that density matrices can describe both mixed and pure states, treating them on the same footing. Moreover, a mixed quantum state on a given quantum system described by a Hilbert space  can be always represented as the partial trace of a pure quantum state (called a purification) on a larger bipartite system  for a sufficiently large Hilbert space .

The density matrix describing a mixed state is defined to be an operator of the form

where  is the fraction of the ensemble in each pure state  The density matrix can be thought of as a way of using the one-particle formalism to describe the behavior of many similar particles by giving a probability distribution (or ensemble) of states that these particles can be found in.

A simple criterion for checking whether a density matrix is describing a pure or mixed state is that the trace of ρ2 is equal to 1 if the state is pure, and less than 1 if the state is mixed. Another, equivalent, criterion is that the von Neumann entropy is 0 for a pure state, and strictly positive for a mixed state.

The rules for measurement in quantum mechanics are particularly simple to state in terms of density matrices. For example, the ensemble average (expectation value) of a measurement corresponding to an observable  is given by

It is important to note that two types of averaging are occurring, one being a weighted quantum superposition over the basis kets  of the pure states, and the other being a statistical (said incoherent) average with the probabilities  of those states.

According to Eugene Wigner, the concept of mixture was put forward by Lev Landau.

Mathematical generalizations
States can be formulated in terms of observables, rather than as vectors in a vector space. These are positive normalized linear functionals on a C*-algebra, or sometimes other classes of algebras of observables.
See State on a C*-algebra and Gelfand–Naimark–Segal construction for more details.

See also

 Atomic electron transition
 Bloch sphere
 Greenberger–Horne–Zeilinger state
 Ground state
 Introduction to quantum mechanics
 No-cloning theorem
 Orthonormal basis
 PBR theorem
 Quantum harmonic oscillator
 Quantum logic gate
 State vector reduction, for historical reasons called a wave function collapse
 Stationary state
 W state

Notes

References

Further reading
The concept of quantum states, in particular the content of the section Formalism in quantum physics above, is covered in most standard textbooks on quantum mechanics.

For a discussion of conceptual aspects and a comparison with classical states, see:
 

For a more detailed coverage of mathematical aspects, see:
  In particular, see Sec. 2.3.

For a discussion of purifications of mixed quantum states, see Chapter 2 of John Preskill's lecture notes for Physics 219  at Caltech.

For a discussion of geometric aspects see:
 , second, revised edition (2017)